Steve Locher (born 19 September 1967 in Salins) is a former Swiss alpine skier, who won the bronze medal in the combined event at the 1992 Winter Olympics in Albertville.

World Cup victories

External links
 
 
 NLZ
 4 Vallées

1967 births
Swiss male alpine skiers
Alpine skiers at the 1992 Winter Olympics
Alpine skiers at the 1994 Winter Olympics
Alpine skiers at the 1998 Winter Olympics
Olympic bronze medalists for Switzerland
Living people
Olympic medalists in alpine skiing
Medalists at the 1992 Winter Olympics
Olympic alpine skiers of Switzerland